Quarna Sotto is a comune (municipality) in the Province of Verbano-Cusio-Ossola in the Italian region Piedmont, located about  northeast of Turin and about  southwest of Verbania.

Quarna Sotto borders the following municipalities: Nonio, Omegna, Quarna Sopra, Valstrona, Varallo Sesia.

References

Cities and towns in Piedmont